Brusco is a surname. Notable people with the surname include:

Mitchie Brusco (born 1997), American skateboarder
Paolo Gerolamo Brusco (1742–1820), Italian painter
Sarah Brusco (born 1978), American Christian musician
Sebastián Brusco (born 1974), Argentine footballer